Stanislav Melnykov (born 26 February 1987 in Odessa) is a Ukrainian 400 metres hurdler and many times national champion.

Competition record

References

1987 births
Ukrainian male hurdlers
Living people
Sportspeople from Odesa
Athletes (track and field) at the 2012 Summer Olympics
Olympic athletes of Ukraine
European Athletics Championships medalists